Charles Patrick Hogan is an American novelist, screenwriter, and television producer. He is best known as the author of Prince of Thieves, and as the co-author of The Strain trilogy with Guillermo del Toro. Alongside del Toro, Hogan created the television series The Strain (2014–2017), adapting their trilogy of vampire novels.

Hogan also wrote the crime novels The Standoff (1995), The Blood Artists (1998), The Killing Moon (2007), and The Devils In Exiles (2010), and the screenplay for the war film 13 Hours: The Secret Soldiers of Benghazi (2016).

Prince of Thieves (2004) was adapted into Ben Affleck's Academy Award-nominated film The Town (2010). The work won the 2005 Hammett Prize and was called one of the ten best novels of the year by Stephen King.

Bibliography
The Standoff (1995)
The Blood Artists (1998)
Prince of Thieves (2004)
The Killing Moon (2007)
The Devils In Exile (2010)

The Strain trilogy 
The Strain (with Guillermo del Toro) (2009)
The Fall (with Guillermo del Toro) (2010)
The Night Eternal (with Guillermo del Toro) (2011)

Filmography

References

1967 births
Living people
Writers from Boston
20th-century American novelists
21st-century American novelists
American male novelists
American mystery writers
American horror writers
Boston College alumni
20th-century American male writers
21st-century American male writers
Novelists from Massachusetts